Cilansetron is an experimental drug that is a 5-HT3 antagonist under development by Solvay Pharmaceuticals.

5-HT3 receptors are responsible for causing many things from nausea to excess bowel movements. In conditions such as irritable bowel syndrome (IBS), the receptors have become faulty or oversensitive. 5-HT3 antagonists work by blocking the nervous and chemical signals from reaching these receptors.

Studies have shown that the drug can improve quality of life in men and women with diarrhea-predominant IBS. Cilansetron is the first 5-HT antagonist specifically designed for IBS that is effective in men as well as women.

In 2005, Solvay received response from the U.S. Food and Drug Administration that cilansertron is not approvable without additional clinical trials; further development has been discontinued.

References

5-HT3 antagonists
Imidazoles
Ketones
AbbVie brands
Abandoned drugs
Heterocyclic compounds with 4 rings